Cazira is a genus of shield bugs found in the Indo-Malayan region. 

The antennae have five joints and the basal segment does not reach the tip of the head. The pronotum is rugose and the scutellum has inflated tuberculations on it. The fore tibiae are dilated and on the underside the abdomen has an abdominal spine that reaches the hind coxae.

About fifteen species are known in the genus.

Species
 Cazira breddini  - Vietnam, Sichuan, Bhutan
 Cazira concinna  - Hainan
 Cazira emeia  - Yunnan
 Cazira flava  - Yunnan
 Cazira friwaldskyi  - Himalayas (= Cazira bhoutanica )
 Cazira inerma  - Sichuan, Fujian, Zhejiang
 Cazira membrania  - Guizhou, Zhejiang
 Cazira montandoni  - Yunnan, Vietnam
 Cazira sichuana  - Sichuan
 Cazira similis  - Northeast India
 Cazira thibetensis  - Sichuan, Yunnan
 Cazira ulceratus  - Java, Sumatra (= Cazira vegeta ) - India, Thailand, Japan
 Cazira verrucosa  - Southern India
 Cazira yunnanica  - Yunnan (earlier under Breddiniella)

References 

Pentatomidae genera